John Hill (April 9, 1797 – April 24, 1861) was a U.S. Representative from North Carolina.

Born near Germanton, North Carolina, Hill completed preparatory studies and was graduated from the University of North Carolina at Chapel Hill in 1816. He was a planter, also serving as clerk of court of Stokes County, North Carolina, for thirty years.

He served as member of the North Carolina House of Commons from 1819 to 1823, and in the North Carolina State Senate 1823-1825, 1830, and 1831.

Hill was elected as a Democrat to the Twenty-sixth Congress (March 4, 1839 – March 3, 1841).
He was a reading clerk in the State Senate in 1850, and served as delegate to the State constitutional convention at Raleigh, North Carolina, in 1861.

Hill died in Raleigh, North Carolina, April 24, 1861, and was interred in Old Hill Burying Ground, near Germanton, North Carolina.

Sources

1797 births
1861 deaths
American planters
University of North Carolina at Chapel Hill alumni
Democratic Party members of the North Carolina House of Representatives
Democratic Party North Carolina state senators
Democratic Party members of the United States House of Representatives from North Carolina
19th-century American politicians
People from Germanton, North Carolina